
This is an incomplete list of Philippine college team nicknames:

Team nicknames

A

B

C

D

E

F

G

H

I

J

L

M

N

O

P

Q

R

S

T

U

V

W

References

See also
 College basketball in the Philippines
 List of Philippine men's collegiate basketball champions

Team nicknames
Philippine college
Sports culture in the Philippines